The God Thing is the second full-length studio album by the German progressive metal band Vanden Plas. It was later re-released in 2004 as a special edition with two bonus tracks.

Track listing

Personnel
Andy Kuntz – vocals
Stephan Lill – guitars
Günter Werno – keyboards
Torsten Reichert – bass
Andreas Lill – drums

Guest musicians
Paul Achim Schneider - cello (on "Fire Blossom", "Crown of Thorns" & "You Fly")
Gunni Mahling - violin (on "Fire Blossom", "Crown of Thorns" & "You Fly")

Production
Produced by Vanden Plas
Recorded and mixed at ROKO Soundstudio in Schöneck, GER
Engineered and mixed by Robert Kohlmeyer
Keyboards and strings recorded at Jam Studio in Pirmasens, GER
Engineered by Stefan Glass
Backing vocals by Andy Kuntz, Stephan Lill & Günter Werno
Cover design and layout by Arsenic
Cover sculpture made by Cesare Marcotto
Sculpture photographed by Manfred Prusseit
Photos by Artur Bente

References

1997 albums
Vanden Plas (band) albums
Inside Out Music albums
Limb Music albums